Tourada à corda ("bullfight by rope"), toirada à corda or corrida de touros à corda, is a type of bullfighting traditional to the Azores Islands, and particularly the island of Terceira, where it is believed to be one of the most ancient recreational traditions in the archipelago.

This type of bullfighting is peculiar to the Azores, and is composed of events with four adult bulls of the breed brava da ilha Terceira along a designated road or street around 500 metres in length. The bull is controlled by a rope around its neck, held by six people (pastores) that direct the bull and prevent its leaving the field of play. The bull is led along the course of the road, and taunted and teased by players, but with no intent to kill the animal; the animal's horns are capped with balls or leather to diminish the risk to the players.  All the bulls are released after each event in order to rest before the next event (at least three weeks).

Portuguese immigrants from the Azores also practice tourada à corda in the city of Brampton in southern Ontario, Canada.

History
The first known tourada à corda was in 1622, organised by the Câmara de Angra during the celebrations in honour of the canonisation of saints Francis Xavier and Ignatius of Loyola. It is presumed by the inclusion of the touradas in the festivities that they were already a popular event.

Sources

 Diário Insular, 5 February 2009.

External links 
 Regulamento das Toiradas à Corda
 Decreto que regulamenta as touradas

Azorean culture
Bullfighting in Portugal
Bull sports
Terceira Island